Beatrice "Bice" Lazzari (15 November 1900 – 13 November 1981) was an Italian painter.

Early life
Beatrice Lazzari was born to Lorenzo (Luciano) Lazzari and Francesca Rinaldo. She was the second of three sisters, the youngest of whom, Onorina (Nini), married architect Carlo Scarpa. Beatrice's training took place in Venice, first at the Benedetto Marcello Conservatory and then at the Fine Art Academy. She was a lecturer at the Academy of Fine Arts. Her work initially turned to figurative painting. Her first exhibition was in 1924 at the collective-Opera Bevilacqua La Masa. In 1928 she had her first solo exhibition at Gallery Art Workshops in Venice and, the following year, another was held at the Galleria San Moise. The Venetian art scene in the 1930s, animated by the Artistic Circle of Palazzo dei Piombi e dal Caffè on the banks of the Zattere, included Carlo Scarpa, Mario Deluigi and Virgilio Guidi and began a pioneering path and rationalist research. Her renown as a painter was for portraits and landscapes. In the applied arts, the artist made a clean break with the figurative tradition, choosing the abstract and geometric compositions as expressive language.

Roman years 1935-1981
In 1935 she moved to Rome where she participated in major exhibitions, exhibiting murals and decorative panels, working with the architect Ernesto Lapadula. In 1941 she married the Venetian architect Diego Rosa.

After the Second World War, except for collaborating with the architect Attilio Lapadula on some furniture, she devoted herself exclusively to painting and received numerous awards for her work. Hers was a new direction, even if the vibrations and modulations of lines and colors on the canvas approached Vasily Vasilievich Kandinsky. In the 1950s she participated in the Venice Biennale and the Rome Quadrennial several times, getting various prizes, and had solo exhibitions in numerous galleries. From the late 1950s to 1963, she worked with oil colors to deepen the application of other materials such as glues, sands, paints and later acrylics. In 1964 the artist started again from scratch, giving up the material and color to express herself with the simplest of means: often lines drawn with graphite on a monochrome background. The series of acrylic paintings executed at the end of the 1960s and 1970s testifies to the last stage of a journey of extraordinary lyricism and modernity, which consolidates her position as major figure in Italian art.

Archive
The Archive Bice Lazzari, which houses an important part of the works, writings, poems and catalog of all its activities, is based in Rome. In 1999, Archival Superintendency for Lazio declared it of considerable historical interest and subject to protection bond.

Bibliography
 Guido Montana, Bice Lazzari. The values of the sign, Weber Gallery Publishing, Turin 1980 
 Paolo Fossati (eds.), Bice Lazzari. Works 1925-1981, Electa Editrice, Milan 1984 
 Paola Watts, Claudio Strinati (ed.), Bice Lazzari 1900-1981. Works 1921-1981, Multigrafica Editrice, Rome 1987 
 Sergio Cortesini, Bice Lazzari, art as a measure, Gangemi Editore, Roma 2002 
 Flavia Scotton, Renato Miracco (ed.), Bice Lazzari. The abstract emotion, Mazzotta Editions, Milan 2005

References

1900 births
1981 deaths
20th-century Italian painters
20th-century Italian women artists
Modern artists
Italian women painters